is a Japanese footballer currently playing as a right back for FC Tokyo.

Career statistics
.

Notes

Honours

Club
FC Tokyo
J.League Cup : 2020

References

External links

1997 births
Living people
Japanese footballers
Association football defenders
J1 League players
FC Tokyo players